Scutellinia subhirtella is a species of fungus belonging to the family Pyronemataceae. It was described as new to science in 1971 by Czech mycologist Mirko Svrček from specimens collected in the former Czechoslovakia. The yellowish-red to red fruitbodies of the fungus measure  in diameter. Spores are hyaline (translucent), ellipsoid, and measure 18–22 by 12–14 μm.

References

External links

Pyronemataceae
Fungi described in 1971
Fungi of Europe